Seaview is an unincorporated community and census-designated place (CDP) in Hawaii County, Hawaii, United States. It is on the eastern side of the island of Hawaii and is bordered to the north by Kamaili, to the northwest by Black Sands, to the southwest by Kalapana, and to the southeast by the Pacific Ocean. Hawaii Route 130 forms the northwest edge of the CDP, and Hawaii Route 137 runs along the Pacific coast in the southeast.

Seaview was first listed as a CDP prior to the 2020 census.

Demographics

References 

Census-designated places in Hawaii County, Hawaii
Census-designated places in Hawaii
Unincorporated communities in Hawaii County, Hawaii